East Star Airlines was an airline based in Wuhan, Hubei, People's Republic of China. It was a privately owned airline and operated scheduled domestic services on 10 routes from Wuhan, and was expected to add more routes as its fleet grew. Its main base was at Wuhan Tianhe International Airport.

History
Its inaugural flight was from Wuhan to Shenzhen using its first Airbus A319.

In July 2007, it was granted rights to operate international services after only a year of service, the first privately owned Chinese airline to be granted permission to operate international flights before Civil Aviation Administration of China's (CAAC) requirement of three-year service.

On 15 March 2009, the airline announced that it was suspending its flights indefinitely. On 30 March 2009, the airline was liquidated by the Wuhan Mid-Court.

On 27 August 2009, the airline officially went bankrupt, after the Intermediate People's Court of Wuhan rejected its last restructuring plan because the investment firm ChinaEquity that had promised to invest between CNY 200 and 300 million, did not specify the source of the funding, failed to provide certificates and documents, and lacked measures to protect creditors, the court stated.

Destinations
East Star Airlines destinations included (at March 2009):

Fleet

The East Star Airlines fleet included the following aircraft (at 2 March 2009):

References

External links

Official website

Airlines established in 2005
Airlines disestablished in 2009
Chinese companies established in 2005
Chinese companies disestablished in 2009
Defunct airlines of China
Companies based in Wuhan